Srikakulam is a village located in Ghantasala Mandal in Diviseema region of Krishna District, Andhra Pradesh. According to Inscription of Kapilendra Deva  the deity of the temple named as Sri Ballava swamy.

History
This place is known for the Srikakulandhra Vishnu temple built in the honor of a king named Andhra Vishnu who reigned before Satavahanas. According to inscriptions Gajapati king of Odisha Kapilendra Deva donated huge wealth for temple renovation. Ganga Devi Queen of Eastern Ganga Dynasty king Narasingha Deva 3, donated gold  and silver ornaments to the temple  .Kasula Purushottama Kavi, a poet under patronage of Zamindar of Challapalli in diviseema region of Andhra Pradesh wrote Āndhra Nāyaka Satakam dedicated to the Lord of the temple.

A more detailed account of the temple here and the associated history of the Andhra kings who ruled over this region is mentioned here

Geography
Srikakulam village is located about 44 kilometers away from Vijayawada at the physical coordinates . It has an average elevation of 9 metres (32 ft).. The village is on the banks of the river Krishna and is almost at the center of the fertile Krishna delta.

Demographics
 Indian census, the demographic details of this village is as follows:
 Total Population: 	7,835 in 1,976 Households.
 Male Population: 	3,877
 Female Population: 	3,958
 Children Under 6-years: 913 (Boys - 446 and Girls - 467)
 Total Literates: 	4,796
 Pin code              521132

Gallery

References

External links

Villages in Krishna district